Phiri Kolobe High is a high school situated in the vicinity of Mankweng, a couple of km from Mankweng Hospital.  The School is well known for its capability in presenting high quality classes, producing multi-talented learners that go on to pursue their degrees in top varsities in South Africa.

Schools in Limpopo
High schools in South Africa